Rubus missouricus is a North American species of bristleberry in section Setosi of the genus Rubus, a member of the rose family. It is found in scattered locations in the north-central (Minnesota, Wisconsin, Michigan, Indiana, Illinois, Iowa, Missouri) and east central (Virginia, Maryland, West Virginia) parts of the United States. Nowhere is it very common.

References

External links
Photo of herbarium specimen at Missouri Botanical Garden, collected in Missouri in 1932

missouricus
Plants described in 1932
Flora of the United States